In the run up to the next Ukrainian parliamentary election, various organisations carried out opinion polling to gauge voter intention in Ukraine. The results of the polls are displayed in this article. The date range for these opinion polls are from the 2019 Ukrainian parliamentary election, held on 21 July, to the day of the next election.

Trusted polling firms 
In Ukraine, there are many unknown and unregistered polling firms. They can suddenly establish and then disappear, be influenced by certain politicians, manipulate questions and the sample. These pseudo-organizations make up opinion polls in the interests of certain politicians and parties, especially Viktor Medvedchuk and OPZZh.

There is a whole database Sellers of ratings of the independent edition Texty, which includes 119 organizations and 220 individuals who have been spotted in the publication of dubious opinion polls or in the hidden PR of politicians. For each of them there is a certificate and history of their activities. There are also separately published the names of real companies with a positive reputation. An important criterion of professional organization is membership in the Sociological Association of Ukraine (SAU).

As of January 2022, the following organizations are accredited members of the SAU:
Oleksandr Yaremenko Ukrainian Institute for Social Research
Vasyl Karazin Kharkiv National University
East Ukrainian Foundation for Social Research
Kyiv International Institute of Sociology (KIIS)
GfK Ukraine
Oleksandr Razumkov Ukrainian Center for Economic and Political Studies (Razumkov Centre)
Kantar Ukraine
SOCIS Center for Social and Marketing Research (SOCIS)
Rating Group Ukraine (Rating)
FAMA Sociological Agency
Social Monitoring Center (SMC)
In 2018, GfK Ukraine employees founded a new company – Info Sapiens.

Ilko Kucheriv Democratic Initiatives Foundation (DIF) also publishes objective data, but it is not a polling firm in the classical sense, but acts as a mediator between the public and polling firms.

Graphical summary 
The chart below shows opinion polls conducted for the next Ukrainian parliamentary election. The trend lines are local regressions (LOESS).

Poll results 
The table below shows the poll results of accredited members of the Sociological Association of Ukraine and the poll results of the Ilko Kucheriv Democratic Initiatives Foundation (DIF), which are sorted in reverse chronological order. The percentages that overcome the 5% electoral threshold are displayed in bold and the background of the highest percentages is shaded in the leading party's colour. The "lead" column shows the percentage point difference between the two parties with the highest figures. When the poll result is a tie, all figures with the highest percentages are shaded.

Since October 2021

June 2021 – September 2021

November 2020 – May 2021

June 2020 – October 2020

July 2019 – May 2020

Monthly averages

See also 
Opinion polling for the next Ukrainian presidential election
Opinion polling for the 2019 Ukrainian parliamentary election

Notes

References 

Ukrainian parliamentary election
Opinion polling in Ukraine
Parliamentary elections in Ukraine